Charline Jones (née Joiner; born 18 April 1988) is a Scottish former racing cyclist from Dunfermline, who won a silver medal at the 2010 Commonwealth Games, in the team sprint.

Personal life
In 2018, she married Glasgow Warriors and Scotland rugby union player Lee Jones. Her brother Craig Joiner also represented Scotland in rugby union, while her father Mike and sister Kerry represented Scotland in triathlon and hockey respectively.

Major results

2008
 3rd Team sprint, National Track Championships
2009
 2nd Team sprint, National Track Championships
2010
 Commonwealth Games
2nd  Team sprint
6th Sprint
 2nd Team sprint, National Track Championships
2012
 Scottish Track Championships
1st Keirin
1st Individual pursuit
1st Scratch
 National Track Championships
2nd Individual pursuit
2nd Points race
3rd Keirin
2013
 2nd Madison, National Track Championships (with Katie Archibald)
2014
 3rd Criterium, National Road Championships
2015
 1st Crit on the Campus
 1st Round 3 – Croydon, Matrix Fitness Grand Prix series
 2nd Stafford Grand Prix
 4th Women's Tour de Yorkshire
 6th Overall Tour of the Reservoir
 7th Cheshire Classic
 9th Milk Race
2016
 6th London Nocturne

See also
City of Edinburgh Racing Club
Achievements of members of City of Edinburgh Racing Club

References

External links
 Profile and diaries at the Braveheart Cycling Fund
 
 

1989 births
Living people
Scottish female cyclists
Scottish track cyclists
Sportspeople from Dunfermline
Cyclists at the 2010 Commonwealth Games
Cyclists at the 2014 Commonwealth Games
Commonwealth Games silver medallists for Scotland
Commonwealth Games medallists in cycling
Medallists at the 2010 Commonwealth Games